Naima Haider (born 19 March 1962) is a Bangladeshi justice of the High Court Division.

Early life and education 
Haider was born on 19 March 1962. Her father, Badrul Haider Chowdhury, was the 5th Chief Justice of Bangladesh. Her mother is Begum Anwara Chowdhury. She passed her LLB and LLM from University of Dhaka. She has completed her second masters in law from Columbia University.

Career 
Haider was elevated as additional judge of the High Court Division on 30 June 2009 and appointed judge on 6 June 2011.

References

External links 
 Judges' List: High Court Division  Name and Short Biography
 Bio in Think Legal Bangladesh

Living people
1962 births
University of Dhaka alumni
Bangladeshi women judges
Columbia Law School alumni